The 37th United States Congress was a meeting of the legislative branch of the United States federal government, consisting of the United States Senate and the United States House of Representatives. It met in Washington, D.C. from March 4, 1861, to March 4, 1863, during the first two years of Abraham Lincoln's presidency. The apportionment of seats in the House of Representatives was based on the 1850 United States census.

For the first time since the party's establishment, the Republicans won the majority of both chambers, and thus full control of Congress. And with Abraham Lincoln becoming the first Republican President after being sworn in on March 4, 1861, the Republicans had their first ever overall federal government trifecta.

Major events 
 
 March 4, 1861: Republican pluralities are seated in Senate and House, becoming governing majorities in both Houses given vacancies among Southerners. Louisiana has 2 of 4 representatives remaining. Although represented in the Confederate Congress, Missouri and Kentucky remained with full delegations in the 37th Congress. 
 March 4, 1861: Abraham Lincoln is inaugurated President of the United States. 
 April 12–14, 1861: Battle of Fort Sumter, Civil War began.
 April 19, 1861: Union blockade of the South begins at Fort Monroe, Virginia.
 April 27, 1861: President Lincoln suspends habeas corpus from Washington, D.C., to Philadelphia and called up 75,000 militia.
 May 6, 1861: Arkansas Secession Convention enacted an Ordinance of Secession.
 May 20, 1861: North Carolina Secession Convention enacted an Ordinance of Secession.
 May 23, 1861: Virginia popular referendum ratified Ordinance of Secession. 5 of 12 U.S. Representatives remained. Two senators from the "Restored Government of Virginia" replaced the two who withdrew.
 June 8, 1861: Tennessee popular referendum ratified Ordinance of Secession. 3 of 10 U.S. Representatives remain. One Senator, Andrew Johnson, remained.
 July 21, 1861: First Battle of Bull Run Union approach to Richmond is repulsed.
 September 17, 1862: Battle of Antietam rebel invasion into Maryland is repulsed.
 September 22, 1862: Emancipation Proclamation ordered, to begin January 1, 1863.
 November 1862: 1862 and 1863 United States House of Representatives elections and 1862 and 1863 United States Senate elections: Democrats gained 31 House seats to 31% and lost 5 Senate seats to 19%.

Two special sessions 

The Senate, a continuing body, was called into special session by President Buchanan, meeting from March 4 to 28, 1861. The border states and Texas were still represented. Shortly after the Senate session adjourned, Fort Sumter was attacked. The immediate results were to draw four additional states "into the confederacy with their more Southern sisters", and Lincoln called Congress into extraordinary session on July 4, 1861. The Senate confirmed calling forth troops and raising money to suppress rebellion as authorized in the Constitution.

Both Houses then duly met July 4, 1861. Seven states which would send representatives held their state elections for Representative over the months of May to June 1861. Members taking their seats had been elected before the secession crisis, during the formation of the Confederate government, and after Fort Sumter.

Once assembled with a quorum in the House, Congress approved Lincoln's war powers innovations as necessary to preserve the Union. Following the July Federal defeat at First Manassas, the Crittenden Resolution asserted the reason for "the present deplorable civil war." It was meant as an address to the nation, especially to the Border States at a time of U.S. military reverses, when the war support in border state populations was virtually the only thing keeping them in the Union.

Following resignations and expulsions occasioned by the outbreak of the Civil War, five states had some degree of dual representation in the U.S and the C.S. congresses. Congress accredited Members elected running in these five as Unionist (19), Democratic (6), Constitutional Unionist (1) and Republican (1).
All ten Kentucky and all seven Missouri representatives were accepted. The other three states seated four of thirteen representatives from Virginia, three of ten Tennesseans, and two of four from Louisiana.

The Crittenden Resolution declared the civil war "… has been forced upon the country by the disunionists of the southern States…" and it would be carried out for the supremacy of the Constitution and the preservation of the Union, and, that accomplished, "the war ought to cease". Democrats seized on this document, especially its assurances of no conquest or overthrowing domestic institutions (emancipation of slaves).

Slaves and slavery 
Congressional policy and military strategy were intertwined. In the first regular March session, Republicans superseded the Crittenden Resolution, removing the prohibition against emancipation of slaves.

In South Carolina, Gen. David Hunter, issued a General Order in early May 1862 freeing all slaves in Florida, Georgia, and South Carolina. President Lincoln quickly rescinded the order, reserving this "supposed power" to his own discretion if it were indispensable to saving the Union. Later in the same month without directly disobeying Lincoln's prohibition against emancipation, General Benjamin Butler at Fort Monroe Virginia declared slaves escaped into his lines as "contraband of war", that is, forfeit to their rebel owners. On May 24, Congress followed General Butler's lead, and passed the First Confiscation Act in August, freeing slaves used for rebellion.

In Missouri, John C. Frémont, the 1856 Republican nominee for president, exceeded his authority as a General, declaring that all slaves held by rebels within his military district would be freed. Republican majorities in Congress responded on opening day of the December Session. Sen. Lyman Trumbull introduced a bill for confiscation of rebel property and emancipation for their slaves. "Acrimonious debate on confiscation proved a major preoccupation" of Congress. On March 13, 1862, Congress directed the armies of the United States to stop enforcing the Fugitive Slave Act. The next month, the Congress abolished slavery in the District of Columbia with compensation for loyal citizens. An additional Confiscation Act in July declared free all slaves held by citizens in rebellion, but it had no practical effect without addressing where the act would take effect, or how ownership was to be proved.

Lincoln's preliminary Emancipation Proclamation was issued September 22, 1862. It became the principal issue before the public in the mid-term elections that year for the 38th Congress. But Republican majorities in both houses held (see 'Congress as a campaign machine' below), and the Republicans actually increased their majority in the Senate.

On January 1, 1863, the war measure by executive proclamation directed the army and the navy to treat all escaped slaves as free when entering Union lines from territory still in rebellion. The measure would take effect when the escaped slave entered Union lines and loyalty of the previous owner was irrelevant. Congress passed enabling legislation to carry out the Proclamation including "Freedman's Bureau" legislation. The practical effect was a massive internal evacuation of Confederate slave labor, and augmenting Union Army teamsters, railroad crews and infantry for the duration of the Civil War.

Joint Committee on the Conduct of the War 
Congress assumed watchdog responsibilities with this and other investigating committees.

The principle conflict between the president and congress was found in the Joint Committee on the Conduct of the War. Eight thick volumes of testimony were filled with investigations of Union defeats and contractor scandals.

They were highly charged with partisan opinions "vehemently expressed" by chair Benjamin Wade of Ohio, Representative George Washington Julian of Indiana, and Zachariah Chandler of Michigan.

Sen. Chandler, who had been one of McClellan's advocates promoting his spectacular rise, particularly documented criticism of McClellan's Peninsular Campaign with its circuitous maneuvering, endless entrenchment and murderous camp diseases. It led to support for his dismissal.

A congressional committee could ruin a reputation, without itself having any military expertise. It would create the modern Congressional era in which generals fought wars with Congress looking over their shoulders, "and with public opinion following closely behind."

Republican Platform goals 

Republican majorities in both houses, apart from pro-union Democrats, and without vacant southern delegations, were able to enact their party platform. These included the Legal Tender Act, February 20, 1862, and increases in the tariff that amounted to protective tariffs. The Homestead Act, May 20, 1862, for government lands, and the Morrill Land Grant Act, July 2, 1862, for universities promoting practical arts in agriculture and mining, had no immediate war purpose. But they would have long range effects, as would the Pacific Railroad Act, July 1, 1862, for a transcontinental railroad.

Treasury innovations were driven by Secretary Salmon P. Chase and necessity of war. The Income Tax of 1861, numerous taxes on consumer goods such as whiskey, and a national currency all began in Civil War Congresses.

Congress as election machinery 

Member's floor speeches were not meant to be persuasive, but for publication in partisan newspapers. The real audience was the constituents back home. Congressional caucuses organized and funded political campaigns, publishing pamphlet versions of speeches and circulating them by the thousands free of postage on the member's franking privilege. Party congressional committees stayed in Washington during national campaigns, keeping an open flow of subsidized literature pouring back into the home districts.

Nevertheless, like other Congresses in the 1850s and 1860s, this Congress would see less than half of its membership reelected.
The characteristic turmoil found in the "3rd Party Period, 1855-1896" stirred political party realignment in the North even in the midst of civil war. In this Congress, failure to gain nomination and loss at the general election together accounted for a Membership turnover of 25%.

Major legislation 

 August 5, 1861: Revenue Act of 1861, Sess. 1, ch. 45, 
 August 6, 1861: Confiscation Act of 1861, Sess. 1, ch. 60, 
 February 19, 1862: Anti-Coolie Act, Sess. 1, ch. 24, 27, 
 February 25, 1862: Legal Tender Act of 1862, Sess. 2, ch. 33, 
 April 16, 1862: District of Columbia Compensated Emancipation Act, Sess. 2, ch. 54, 
 May 15, 1862: An Act to Establish a Department of Agriculture, Sess. 2, ch. 72, 
 May 20, 1862: Homestead Act, Sess. 2, ch. 75, 
 June 19, 1862: An Act to secure Freedom to all persons within the Territories of the United States, Sess. 2, ch 111, 
 July 1, 1862: Morrill Anti-Bigamy Act, Sess. 2, ch. 126, 
 July 1, 1862: Revenue Act of 1862, Sess. 2, ch. 119, 
 July 1, 1862: Pacific Railway Act, Sess. 2, ch. 120, 
 July 2, 1862: Morrill Land Grant Colleges Act, Sess. 2, ch. 130, 
 July 17, 1862: Militia Act of 1862, Sess. 2, ch. 201, 
 February 25, 1863: National Bank Act, Sess. 3, ch 58, 
 March 2, 1863: False Claims Act, Sess. 3, ch. 67, 
 March 3, 1863: Enrollment Act, Sess. 3, ch. 75, 
 March 3, 1863: Habeas Corpus Suspension Act, Sess. 3, ch. 81, 
 March 3, 1863: Tenth Circuit Act,

States admitted and territories organized

States admitted 
 December 31, 1862: West Virginia admitted, Sess. 3, ch. 6, pending a presidential proclamation. (It became a state on June 20, 1863)

Territories organized 
 July 14, 1862: Nevada–Utah boundary line moved to the east, enlarging Nevada and reducing Utah in size, Sess. 2, ch. 12, 
 February 24, 1863: Arizona Territory organized, Sess. 3, ch. 56, 
 March 3, 1863: Idaho Territory organized, Sess. 3, ch. 117,

States in rebellion 

Congress did not accept secession. Most of the Representatives and Senators from states that attempted to secede left Congress; those who took part in the rebellion were expelled.
 Secessions declared during previous Congress: South Carolina, Mississippi, Florida, Alabama, Georgia, Louisiana, and Texas. 
 Louisiana Congressional Districts LA 1 and 2, two of its four representatives remained seated in the 37th Congress.
 Secessions declared during this Congress:
 April 17, 1861: Virginia (The pro-Union Restored Government of Virginia's two senators were seated, along with duly elected Representatives for VA 1, 7, 10, 11 and 12, five of its 13 representatives in the House.)
 May 6, 1861: Arkansas
 May 20, 1861: North Carolina
 June 8, 1861: Tennessee (Sen. Andrew Johnson and three of the ten duly elected members of the House did not recognize secession and retained their seats in TN 2, 3 and 4.)

Although secessionist factions passed resolutions of secession in Missouri October 31, 1861, and in Kentucky November 20, 1861, their state delegations in the U.S. Congress remained in place, seven from Missouri and ten from Kentucky. Exile state governments resided with Confederate armies out-of-state, army-elected congressional representatives served as a solid pro-Jefferson Davis administration voting bloc in the Confederate Congress.

Party summary

Senate

House of Representatives

Leadership

Senate 

 President: Hannibal Hamlin (R)
 President pro tempore: Solomon Foot (R)
 Republican Conference Chairman: John P. Hale

House of Representatives 
 Speaker: Galusha A. Grow (R)

Members 
This list is arranged by chamber, then by state. Senators are listed by class, and representatives by district.

Skip to House of Representatives, below

Senate 
Senators were elected by the state legislatures every two years, with one-third beginning new six-year terms with each Congress. Preceding the names in the list below are Senate class numbers, which indicate the cycle of their election. In this Congress, Class 1 meant their term ended with this Congress, facing re-election in 1862; Class 2 meant their term began in the last Congress, facing re-election in 1864; and Class 3 meant their term began in this Congress, facing re-election in 1866.

Alabama 
 2. Vacant
 3. Vacant

Arkansas 
 2. William K. Sebastian (D), until July 11, 1861, vacant thereafter
 3. Charles B. Mitchel (D), until July 11, 1861, vacant thereafter

California 
 1. Milton S. Latham (D)
 3. James A. McDougall (D)

Connecticut 
 1. James Dixon (R)
 3. Lafayette S. Foster (R)

Delaware 
 1. James A. Bayard Jr. (D)
 2. Willard Saulsbury Sr. (D)

Florida 
 1. Vacant
 3. Vacant

Georgia 
 2. Vacant
 3. Vacant

Illinois 
 2. Stephen A. Douglas (D), until June 3, 1861
 Orville H. Browning (R), June 26, 1861 – January 12, 1863
 William A. Richardson (D), from January 12, 1863
 3. Lyman Trumbull (R)

Indiana 
 1. Jesse D. Bright (D), until February 5, 1862
 Joseph A. Wright (U), February 24, 1862 – January 14, 1863
 David Turpie (D), from January 14, 1863
 3. Henry S. Lane (R)

Iowa 
 2. James W. Grimes (R)
 3. James Harlan (R)

Kansas 
 2. James H. Lane (R), from April 4, 1861
 3. Samuel C. Pomeroy (R), from April 4, 1861

Kentucky 
 2. Lazarus W. Powell (D)
 3. John C. Breckinridge (D), until December 4, 1861
 Garrett Davis (U), from December 23, 1861

Louisiana 
 2. Vacant
 3. Vacant

Maine 
 1. Lot M. Morrill (R)
 2. William P. Fessenden (R)

Maryland 
 1. Anthony Kennedy (U)
 3. James Pearce (D), until December 20, 1862
 Thomas H. Hicks (U), from December 29, 1862

Massachusetts 
 1. Charles Sumner (R)
 2. Henry Wilson (R)

Michigan 
 1. Zachariah Chandler (R)
 2. Kinsley S. Bingham (R), until October 5, 1861
 Jacob M. Howard (R), from January 17, 1862

Minnesota 
 1. Henry M. Rice (D)
 2. Morton S. Wilkinson (R)

Mississippi 
 1. Vacant
 2. Vacant

Missouri 
 1. Trusten Polk (D), until January 10, 1862
 John B. Henderson (U), from January 17, 1862
 3. Waldo P. Johnson (D), March 17, 1861 – January 10, 1862
 Robert Wilson (U), from January 17, 1862

New Hampshire 
 2. John P. Hale (R)
 3. Daniel Clark (R)

New Jersey 
 1. John R. Thomson (D), until September 12, 1862
 Richard S. Field (R), November 21, 1862 – January 14, 1863
 James W. Wall (D), from January 14, 1863
 2. John C. Ten Eyck (R)

New York 
 1. Preston King (R)
 3. Ira Harris (R)

North Carolina 
 2. Thomas Bragg (D), until March 6, 1861, vacant thereafter
 3. Thomas L. Clingman (D), until March 28, 1861, vacant thereafter

Ohio 
 1. Benjamin F. Wade (R)
 3. Salmon P. Chase (R), until March 7, 1861
 John Sherman (R), from March 21, 1861

Oregon 
 2. Edward D. Baker (R), until October 21, 1861
 Benjamin Stark (D), October 29, 1861 – September 12, 1862
 Benjamin F. Harding (D), from September 12, 1862
 3. James W. Nesmith (D)

Pennsylvania 
 1. Simon Cameron (R), until March 4, 1861
 David Wilmot (R), from March 14, 1861
 3. Edgar Cowan (R)

Rhode Island 
 1. James F. Simmons (R), until August 15, 1862
 Samuel G. Arnold (R), from December 1, 1862
 2. Henry B. Anthony (R)

South Carolina 
 2. Vacant
 3. Vacant

Tennessee 
 1. Andrew Johnson (D), until March 4, 1862, vacant thereafter
 2. Vacant

Texas 
 1. Louis T. Wigfall (D), until March 23, 1861, vacant thereafter
 2. John Hemphill (D), until July 11, 1861, vacant thereafter

Vermont 
 1. Solomon Foot (R)
 3. Jacob Collamer (R)

Virginia 
 1. James M. Mason (D), until March 28, 1861
 Waitman T. Willey (U), from July 9, 1861
 2. Robert M. T. Hunter (D), until March 28, 1861
 John S. Carlile (U), from July 9, 1861

Wisconsin 
 1. James R. Doolittle (R)
 3. Timothy O. Howe (R)

House of Representatives 
Members of the House of Representatives are listed by their districts.

Alabama 
 . Vacant
 . Vacant
 . Vacant
 . Vacant
 . Vacant
 . Vacant
 . Vacant

Arkansas 
 . Vacant
 . Vacant

California 
All representatives were elected statewide on a general ticket.
 . Frederick F. Low (R), from June 3, 1862
 . Timothy G. Phelps (R)
 . Aaron A. Sargent (R)

Connecticut 
 . Dwight Loomis (R)
 . James E. English (D)
 . Alfred A. Burnham (R)
 . George C. Woodruff (D)

Delaware 
 . George P. Fisher (U)

Florida 
 . Vacant

Georgia 
 . Vacant
 . Vacant
 . Vacant
 . Vacant
 . Vacant
 . Vacant
 . Vacant
 . Vacant

Illinois 
 . Elihu B. Washburne (R)
 . Isaac N. Arnold (R)
 . Owen Lovejoy (R)
 . William Kellogg (R)
 . William A. Richardson (D), until January 29, 1863, vacant thereafter
 . John A. McClernand (D), until October 28, 1861
 Anthony L. Knapp (D), from December 12, 1861
 . James C. Robinson (D)
 . Philip B. Fouke (D)
 . John A. Logan (D), until April 2, 1862
 William J. Allen (D), from June 2, 1862

Indiana 
 . John Law (D)
 . James A. Cravens (D)
 . William McKee Dunn (R)
 . William S. Holman (D)
 . George W. Julian (R)
 . Albert G. Porter (R)
 . Daniel W. Voorhees (D)
 . Albert S. White (R)
 . Schuyler Colfax (R)
 . William Mitchell (R)
 . John P. C. Shanks (R)

Iowa 
 . Samuel Curtis (R), until August 4, 1861
 James F. Wilson (R), from October 8, 1861
 . William Vandever (R)

Kansas 
 . Martin F. Conway (R)

Kentucky 
 . Henry C. Burnett (D), until December 3, 1861
 Samuel L. Casey (U), from March 10, 1862
 . James S. Jackson (U), until December 13, 1861
 George H. Yeaman (U), from December 1, 1862
 . Henry Grider (U)
 . Aaron Harding (U)
 . Charles A. Wickliffe (U)
 . George W. Dunlap (U)
 . Robert Mallory (U)
 . John J. Crittenden (U)
 . William H. Wadsworth (U)
 . John W. Menzies (U)

Louisiana 
 . Benjamin F. Flanders (U), from December 3, 1862
 . Michael Hahn (U), from December 3, 1862
 . Vacant
 . Vacant

Maine 
 . John N. Goodwin (R)
 . Charles W. Walton (R), until May 26, 1862
 Thomas A. D. Fessenden (R), from December 1, 1862
 . Samuel C. Fessenden (R)
 . Anson P. Morrill (R)
 . John H. Rice (R)
 . Frederick A. Pike (R)

Maryland 
 . John W. Crisfield (U)
 . Edwin H. Webster (U)
 . Cornelius L. L. Leary (U)
 . Henry May (U)
 . Francis Thomas (U)
 . Charles B. Calvert (U)

Massachusetts 
 . Thomas D. Eliot (R)
 . James Buffington (R)
 . Charles F. Adams Sr. (R), until May 1, 1861
 Benjamin Thomas (U), from June 11, 1861
 . Alexander H. Rice (R)
 . William Appleton (CU), until September 27, 1861
 Samuel Hooper (R), from December 2, 1861
 . John B. Alley (R)
 . Daniel W. Gooch (R)
 . Charles R. Train (R)
 . Goldsmith F. Bailey (R), until May 8, 1862
 Amasa Walker (R), from December 1, 1862
 . Charles Delano (R)
 . Henry L. Dawes (R)

Michigan 
 . Bradley F. Granger (R)
 . Fernando C. Beaman (R)
 . Francis W. Kellogg (R)
 . Rowland E. Trowbridge (R)

Minnesota 
Both representatives were elected statewide on a general ticket.
 . Cyrus Aldrich (R)
 . William Windom (R)

Mississippi 
 . Vacant
 . Vacant
 . Vacant
 . Vacant
 . Vacant

Missouri 
 . Francis P. Blair Jr. (R)
 . James S. Rollins (CU)
 . John B. Clark (D), until July 13, 1861
 William A. Hall (D), from January 20, 1862
 . Elijah H. Norton (D)
 . John W. Reid (D), until August 3, 1861
 Thomas L. Price (D), from January 21, 1862
 . John S. Phelps (D)
 . John W. Noell (D)

New Hampshire 
 . Gilman Marston (R)
 . Edward H. Rollins (R)
 . Thomas M. Edwards (R)

New Jersey 
 . John T. Nixon (R)
 . John L. N. Stratton (R)
 . William G. Steele (D)
 . George T. Cobb (D)
 . Nehemiah Perry (D)

New York 
 . Edward H. Smith (D)
 . Moses F. Odell (D)
 . Benjamin Wood (D)
 . James E. Kerrigan (ID)
 . William Wall (R)
 . Frederick A. Conkling (R)
 . Elijah Ward (D)
 . Isaac C. Delaplaine (D)
 . Edward Haight (D)
 . Charles H. Van Wyck (R)
 . John B. Steele (D)
 . Stephen Baker (R)
 . Abram B. Olin (R)
 . Erastus Corning (D)
 . James B. McKean (R)
 . William A. Wheeler (R)
 . Socrates N. Sherman (R)
 . Chauncey Vibbard (D)
 . Richard Franchot (R)
 . Roscoe Conkling (R)
 . R. Holland Duell (R)
 . William E. Lansing (R)
 . Ambrose W. Clark (R)
 . Charles B. Sedgwick (R)
 . Theodore M. Pomeroy (R)
 . Jacob P. Chamberlain (R)
 . Alexander S. Diven (R)
 . Robert B. Van Valkenburgh (R)
 . Alfred Ely (R)
 . Augustus Frank (R)
 . Burt Van Horn (R)
 . Elbridge G. Spaulding (R)
 . Reuben Fenton (R)

North Carolina 
 . Vacant
 . Vacant
 . Vacant
 . Vacant
 . Vacant
 . Vacant
 . Vacant
 . Vacant

Ohio 
 . George H. Pendleton (D)
 . John A. Gurley (R)
 . Clement Vallandigham (D)
 . William Allen (D)
 . James M. Ashley (R)
 . Chilton A. White (D)
 . Thomas Corwin (R), until March 12, 1861
 Richard A. Harrison (U), from July 4, 1861
 . Samuel Shellabarger (R)
 . Warren P. Noble (D)
 . Carey A. Trimble (R)
 . Valentine B. Horton (R)
 . Samuel S. Cox (D)
 . John Sherman (R), until March 21, 1861
 Samuel T. Worcester (R), from July 4, 1861
 . Harrison G. O. Blake (R)
 . Robert H. Nugen (D)
 . William P. Cutler (R)
 . James R. Morris (D)
 . Sidney Edgerton (R)
 . Albert G. Riddle (R)
 . John Hutchins (R)
 . John Bingham (R)

Oregon 
 . Andrew J. Thayer (D), until July 30, 1861
 George K. Shiel (D), from July 30, 1861

Pennsylvania 
 . William E. Lehman (D)
 . Edward Joy Morris (R), until June 8, 1861
 Charles J. Biddle (D), from July 2, 1861
 . John P. Verree (R)
 . William D. Kelley (R)
 . William Morris Davis (R)
 . John Hickman (R)
 . Thomas B. Cooper (D), until April 4, 1862
 John D. Stiles (D), from June 3, 1862
 . Sydenham E. Ancona (D)
 . Thaddeus Stevens (R)
 . John W. Killinger (R)
 . James H. Campbell (R)
 . George W. Scranton (R), until March 24, 1861
 Hendrick B. Wright (D), from July 4, 1861
 . Philip Johnson (D)
 . Galusha A. Grow (R)
 . James T. Hale (R)
 . Joseph Bailey (D)
 . Edward McPherson (R)
 . Samuel S. Blair (R)
 . John Covode (R)
 . Jesse Lazear (D)
 . James K. Moorhead (R)
 . Robert McKnight (R)
 . John W. Wallace (R)
 . John Patton (R)
 . Elijah Babbitt (R)

Rhode Island 
 . William P. Sheffield (U)
 . George H. Browne (U)

South Carolina 
 . Vacant
 . Vacant
 . Vacant
 . Vacant
 . Vacant
 . Vacant

Tennessee 
 . Vacant
 . Horace Maynard (U)
 . George W. Bridges (U), from February 25, 1863
 . Andrew J. Clements (U)
 . Vacant
 . Vacant
 . Vacant
 . Vacant
 . Vacant
 . Vacant

Texas 
 . Vacant
 . Vacant

Vermont 
 . Eliakim P. Walton (R)
 . Justin S. Morrill (R)
 . Portus Baxter (R)

Virginia 
 . Joseph E. Segar (U), from May 6, 1862
 . Vacant
 . Vacant
 . Vacant
 . Vacant
 . Vacant
 . Charles H. Upton (U), July 4, 1861 – February 27, 1862
 Lewis McKenzie (U), from February 16, 1863
 . Vacant
 . Vacant
 . William G. Brown Sr. (U)
 . John S. Carlile (U), until July 9, 1861
 Jacob B. Blair (U), from December 2, 1861
 . Kellian Whaley (U)
 . Vacant

Wisconsin 
 . John F. Potter (R)
 . Luther Hanchett (R), until November 24, 1862
 Walter D. McIndoe (R), from January 26, 1863
 . A. Scott Sloan (R)

Non-voting members 
 . Hiram P. Bennet (R), from August 19, 1861
 . John B. S. Todd (D), from December 9, 1861
 . Samuel G. Daily (R)
 . John Cradlebaugh (I), from December 2, 1861
 . John S. Watts (R)
 . John M. Bernhisel (I)
 . William H. Wallace (R)

Changes in membership 
The count below reflects changes from the beginning of this Congress.

Senate 

|-
| Missouri (3)
| Vacant
| Did not take seat until after Congress commenced.
| nowrap  | Waldo P. Johnson (D)
| March 17, 1861

|-
| Kansas (2)
| Vacant
| Election not recognized by US Senate.
| nowrap  | James H. Lane (R)
| April 4, 1861

|-
| Kansas (3)
| Vacant
| Election not recognized by the Senate.
| nowrap  | Samuel C. Pomeroy (R)
| April 4, 1861

|-
| Pennsylvania (1)
| nowrap  | Simon Cameron (R)
| Resigned March 4, 1861, to become Secretary of War.Successor was elected.
| nowrap  | David Wilmot (R)
| March 14, 1861

|-
| North Carolina (2)
| nowrap  | Thomas Bragg (D)
| Withdrew March 6, 1861; expelled later in 1861.
| colspan=2 | Vacant thereafter

|-
| Ohio (3)
| nowrap  | Salmon P. Chase (R)
| Resigned March 7, 1861, to become Secretary of the Treasury.Successor was elected.
| nowrap  | John Sherman (R)
| March 21, 1861

|-
| Texas (1)
| nowrap  | Louis T. Wigfall (D)
| Withdrew March 23, 1861.
| colspan=2 | Vacant thereafter

|-
| North Carolina (3)
| nowrap  | Thomas L. Clingman (D)
| Withdrew March 28, 1861; expelled later in 1861.
| colspan=2 | Vacant thereafter

|-
| Virginia (2)
| nowrap  | Robert M. T. Hunter (D)
| Withdrew March 28, 1861, and later expelled for support of the rebellion.Successor was elected.
| nowrap  | John S. Carlile (U)
| July 9, 1861

|-
| Virginia (1)
| nowrap  | James M. Mason (D)
| Expelled March 28, 1861, for supporting the rebellion.Successor was elected.
| nowrap  | Waitman T. Willey (U)
| July 9, 1861

|-
| Illinois (2)
| nowrap  | Stephen A. Douglas (D)
| Died June 3, 1861.Successor was appointed.
| nowrap  | Orville H. Browning (R)
| June 26, 1861

|-
| Texas (2)
| nowrap  | John Hemphill (D)
| Expelled sometime in July 1861.
| colspan=2 | Vacant thereafter

|-
| Illinois (2)
| nowrap  | Orville H. Browning (R)
| Interim appointee lost election to finish the term.Successor elected January 12, 1863.
| nowrap  | William A. Richardson (D)
| January 30, 1863

|-
| Arkansas (2)
| nowrap  | William K. Sebastian (D)
| Expelled July 11, 1861.
| colspan=2 | Vacant thereafter

|-
| Arkansas (3)
| nowrap  | Charles B. Mitchel (D)
| Expelled July 11, 1861.
| colspan=2 | Vacant thereafter

|-
| Michigan (2)
| nowrap  | Kinsley S. Bingham (R)
| Died October 5, 1861.Successor was elected.
| nowrap  | Jacob M. Howard (R)
| January 17, 1862

|-
| Oregon (2)
| nowrap  | Edward D. Baker (R)
| Killed at Battle of Ball's Bluff October 21, 1861.Successor was appointed.
| nowrap  | Benjamin Stark (D)
| October 29, 1861

|-
| Kentucky (3)
| nowrap  | John C. Breckinridge (D)
| Expelled December 4, 1861, for supporting the rebellion.Successor was elected.
| nowrap  | Garrett Davis (U)
| December 23, 1861

|-
| Missouri (1)
| nowrap  | Trusten Polk (D)
| Expelled January 10, 1862, for supporting the rebellion.Successor was appointed.
| nowrap  | John B. Henderson (U)
| January 17, 1862

|-
| Missouri (3)
| nowrap  | Waldo P. Johnson (D)
| Expelled January 10, 1862, for disloyalty to the government.Successor was appointed.
| nowrap  | Robert Wilson (U)
| January 17, 1862

|-
| Indiana (1)
| nowrap  | Jesse D. Bright (D)
| Expelled February 5, 1862, on charges of disloyalty.Successor was appointed.
| nowrap  | Joseph A. Wright (U)
| February 24, 1862

|-
| Tennessee (1)
| nowrap  | Andrew Johnson (D)
| Resigned March 4, 1862.
| colspan=2 | Vacant thereafter

|-
| Rhode Island (1)
| nowrap  | James F. Simmons (R)
| Resigned August 15, 1862.Successor was elected.
| nowrap  | Samuel G. Arnold (R)
| December 1, 1862

|-
| New Jersey (1)
| nowrap  | John R. Thomson (D)
| Died September 12, 1862.Successor was appointed.
| nowrap  | Richard S. Field (R)
| November 21, 1862

|-
| Oregon (2)
| nowrap  | Benjamin Stark (D)
| Retired September 12, 1862, upon election of a successor.
| nowrap  | Benjamin F. Harding (D)
| September 12, 1862

|-
| Maryland (3)
| nowrap  | James Pearce (D)
| Died December 20, 1862.Successor was appointed.
| nowrap  | Thomas H. Hicks (U)
| December 29, 1862

|-
| Indiana (1)
| nowrap  | Joseph A. Wright (U)
| Retired January 14, 1863, upon election of a successor.
| nowrap  | David Turpie (D)
| January 14, 1863

|-
| New Jersey (1)
| nowrap  | Richard S. Field (R)
| Retired January 14, 1863, upon election of a successor.
| nowrap  | James W. Wall (D)
| January 14, 1863
|}

House of Representatives 

|-
| 
| colspan=2 | New seat.
| nowrap  | Hiram P. Bennett (Conservative R)
| August 19, 1861

|-
| 
| colspan=2 | New seat.
| nowrap  | John Cradlebaugh (I)
| December 2, 1861

|-
| 
| colspan=2 | New seat.
| nowrap  | John B. S. Todd (D)
| December 9, 1861

|-
| 
| colspan=2 | Vacant.
| nowrap  | Benjamin F. Flanders (U)
| December 3, 1862

|-
| 
| colspan=2 | Vacant.
| nowrap  | Michael Hahn (U)
| December 3, 1862

|-
| 
| Vacant
| Representative-elect George W. Bridges was arrested by Confederate troops while en route to Washington, D.C. and held prisoner before he escaped.
| nowrap  | George W. Bridges (U)
| February 25, 1863

|-
| 
| colspan=2 | Vacant.
| nowrap  | Joseph E. Segar (U)
| May 6, 1862

|-
| 
| Vacant
| Low not permitted to take seat, qualified later under special act of Congress, 
| nowrap  | Frederick F. Low (R)
| June 3, 1862

|-
| 
| colspan=2 | Vacant.
| nowrap  | Charles H. Upton (U)
| July 4, 1861

|-
| 
| nowrap  | Thomas Corwin (R)
| Resigned March 12, 1861, to become Minister to Mexico.
| nowrap  | Richard A. Harrison (U)
| July 4, 1861

|-
| 
| nowrap  | John Sherman (R)
| Resigned March 12, 1861, when elected U.S. Senator.
| nowrap  | Samuel T. Worcester (R)
| July 4, 1861

|-
| 
| nowrap  | George W. Scranton (R)
| Died March 24, 1861.
| nowrap  | Hendrick B. Wright (D)
| July 4, 1861

|-
| 
| nowrap  | Charles F. Adams Sr. (R)
| Resigned May 1, 1861, to become Ambassador to Great Britain.
| nowrap  | Benjamin Thomas (U)
| June 11, 1861

|-
| 
| nowrap  | Edward Joy Morris (R)
| Resigned June 8, 1861, to become Minister Resident to Turkey.
| nowrap  | Charles J. Biddle (D)
| July 2, 1861

|-
| 
| nowrap  | John S. Carlile (U)
| Resigned July 9, 1861, to become United States Senator from the loyal faction of Virginia.
| nowrap  | Jacob B. Blair (U)
| December 2, 1861

|-
| 
| nowrap  | John Bullock Clark (D)
| Expelled July 13, 1861, for having taken up arms against the Union.
| nowrap  | William A. Hall (D)
| January 20, 1862

|-
| 
| nowrap  | Andrew J. Thayer (D)
| Election was successfully contested July 30, 1861.
| nowrap  | George K. Shiel (D)
| July 30, 1861

|-
| 
| nowrap  | John W. Reid (D)
| Withdrew August 3, 1861, and then expelled December 2, 1861, for having taken up arms against the Union.
| nowrap  | Thomas L. Price (D)
| January 21, 1862

|-
| 
| nowrap  | Samuel Curtis (R)
| Resigned August 4, 1861, to become colonel of the 2nd Iowa Infantry.
| nowrap  | James F. Wilson (R)
| October 8, 1861

|-
| 
| nowrap  | William Appleton (CU)
| Resigned September 27, 1861, due to failing health.
| nowrap  | Samuel Hooper (R)
| December 2, 1861

|-
| 
| nowrap  | John A. McClernand (D)
| Resigned October 28, 1861, to accept a commission as brigadier general of volunteers for service in the Civil War.
| nowrap  | Anthony L. Knapp (D)
| December 12, 1861

|-
| 
| nowrap  | Henry C. Burnett (D)
| Expelled December 3, 1861, for support of secession.
| nowrap  | Samuel L. Casey (U)
| March 10, 1862

|-
| 
| nowrap  | James S. Jackson (U)
| Resigned December 13, 1861, to enter the Union Army.
| nowrap  | George H. Yeaman (U)
| December 1, 1862

|-
| 
| nowrap  | Charles H. Upton (U)
| Declared not entitled to seat February 27, 1862.
| nowrap  | Lewis McKenzie (U)
| February 16, 1863

|-
| 
| nowrap  | John A. Logan (D)
| Resigned April 2, 1862, to enter the Union Army.
| nowrap  | William J. Allen (D)
| June 2, 1862

|-
| 
| nowrap  | Thomas B. Cooper (D)
| Died April 4, 1862.
| nowrap  | John D. Stiles (D)
| June 3, 1862

|-
| 
| nowrap  | Goldsmith F. Bailey (R)
| Died May 8, 1862.
| nowrap  | Amasa Walker (R)
| December 1, 1862

|-
| 
| nowrap  | Charles W. Walton (R)
| Resigned May 26, 1862, to become associate justice of the Maine Supreme Judicial Court.
| nowrap  | Thomas A. D. Fessenden (R)
| December 1, 1862

|-
| 
| nowrap  | Luther Hanchett (R)
| Died November 24, 1862.
| nowrap  | Walter D. McIndoe (R)
| January 26, 1863

|-
| 
| nowrap  | William A. Richardson (D)
| Resigned January 29, 1863, after being elected to the U.S. Senate.
| colspan=2 | Vacant thereafter

|}

Committees

Senate 

Standing committees of the Senate resolved, Friday, March 8, 1861

Foreign Relations 
 Charles Sumner (R-Massachusetts) (Chairman)
 Jacob Collamer (R-Vermont)
 James Rood Doolittle (R-Wisconsin)
 Ira Harris (R-New York)
 Stephen A. Douglas (D-Illinois)
 Trusten Polk (D-Missouri)
 John C. Breckinridge (D-Kentucky)

Finance 
 William P. Fessenden (R-Maine) (Chairman)
 James F. Simmons (R-Rhode Island)
 Jacob Collamer (R-Vermont)
 Benjamin F. Wade (R-Massachusetts)
 Timothy O. Howe (R-Wisconsin)
 Robert M. T. Hunter (D-Virginia)
 James Pearce (D-Maryland)
 Jesse D. Bright (D-Indiana)

Commerce 
 Zachariah Chandler (R-Michigan) (Chairman)
 Preston King (R-New York)
 Lot Morrill (R-Maine)
 Henry Wilson (R-Massachusetts)
 Thomas L. Clingman (D-North Carolina)
 Samuel G. Arnold (R-Rhode Island)
 Willard Saulsbury Jr. (D-North Carolina)
 Andrew Johnson (D-Tennsessee)

Military Affairs and Militia 
 Henry Wilson (R-Massachusetts) (Chairman)
 Preston King (R-New York)
 Edward D. Baker (R-Oregon)
 Henry S. Lane (R-Indiana)
 James H. Lane (R-Kansas)
 Henry M. Rice (R-Minnesota)
 Milton S. Latham (D-California)
 John Breckinridge (D-Kentucky)
 Jacob M. Howard (R-Michigan)

Naval Affairs 
 John P. Hale (R-New Hampshire) (Chairman)
 James W. Grimes (R-Iowa)
 Solomon Foot (R-Vermont)
 Edgar Cowan (R-New Hampshire)
 John Renshaw Thomson (R-New Jersey)
 Anthony Kennedy (U-Maryland)
 Richard Stockton Field (R-New Jersey)
 John Sherman (D-Ohio)

Judiciary 
 Lyman Trumbull (R-Ohio) (Chairman)
 Lafayette S. Foster (R-Connecticut)
 John C. Ten Eyck (R-New Jersey)
 Jacob M. Howard (R-Michigan)
 Ira Harris (R-New York)
 Edgar Cowan (R-Pennsylvania)
 James A. Bayard Jr. (D-Delaware)
 Lazarus W. Powell (D-Kentucky)
 Thomas L. Clingman (D-North Carolina)

Post Offices and Post Roads 
 Jacob Collamer (R-Vermont) (Chairman)
 James Dixon (R-Connecticut)
 Benjamin Wade (R-Connecticut)
 Lyman Trumbull (R-Illinois)
 Henry M. Rice (D-Minnesota)
 Jesse D. Bright (D-Indiana)
 Milton S. Latham (D-California)

Public Lands 
 James Harlan (R-Iowa) (Chairman)
 Kinsley S. Bingham (R-Michigan)
 Daniel Clark (R-New Hampshire)
 Morton S. Wilkinson (R-Minnesota)
 Andrew Johnson (D-Tennsessee)
 Joseph A. Wright (U-Indiana)
 Benjamin F. Harding (D-Oregon)
 Thomas Bragg (D-North Carolina)
 Samuel C. Pomeroy (R-Kansas)
 John S. Carlile (U-Virginia)

Private Land Claims 
 Ira Harris (R-New York) (Chairman)
 John C. Ten Eyck (R-New York)
 Charles Sumner (R-New York)
 Trusten Polk (D-Missouri)
 James A. Bayard Jr. (D-Delaware)
 Henry M. Rice (D-Minnesota)
 Daniel Clark (R-New Hampshire)

Indian Affairs 
 James Rood Doolittle (R-Wisconsin) (Chairman)
 Edward D. Baker (D-Oregon)
 Edgar Cowan (D-Pennsylvania)
 John C. Ten Eyck (R-New Jersey)
 William K. Sebastian (D-Arkansas)
 Henry M. Rice (D-Minnesota)
 James W. Nesmith (D-Oregon)

Pensions 
 Lafayette S. Foster (R-Michigan) (Chairman)
 Kinsley S. Bingham (R-Minnesota)
 Henry S. Lane (R-Indiana)
 James F. Simmons (R-Rhode Island)
 Willard Saulsbury Sr. (D-Delaware)
 Samuel C. Pomeroy (R-Kansas)
 Waitman T. Willey (U-Virginia)

Revolutionary Claims 
 Preston King (R-New York) (Chairman)
 Zachariah Chandler (R-Michigan) 
 Morton S. Wilkinson (D-Minnesota)
 John P. Hale (R-New Hampshire)
 James W. Nesmith (D-Oregon)

Claims 
 Daniel Clark (R-New Hampshire) (Chairman)
 James F. Simmons (R-Rhode Island)
 Timothy O. Howe (R-Wisconsin)
 Edgar Cowan (R-Pennsylvania)
 Thomas Bragg (D-North Carolina)
 Trusten Polk (D-Missouri)
 Samuel C. Pomeroy (R-Kansas)
 Richard Stockton Field (R-New Jersey)
 David Wilmot (R-Pennsylvania)
 Milton S. Latham (D-California)

District of Columbia 
 James W. Grimes (R-Iowa) (Chairman)
 Henry B. Anthony (R-Rhode Island)
 Lot Morrill (R-Maine)
 Benjamin F. Wade (R-Ohio)
 Anthony Kennedy (U-Maryland)
 Thomas L. Clingman (D-North Carolina)
 John B. Henderson (D-Missouri)

Patents and Patent Office 
 James F. Simmons (R-Rhode Island) (Chairman)
 Charles Sumner (R-Massachusetts)
 James Rood Doolittle (R-Wisconsin)
 Edgar Cowan (R-Pennsylvania)
 John R. Thomson (D-New Jersey)
 William K. Sebastian (D-Arkansas)
 Willard Saulsbury Sr. (D-Delaware)
 Richard Stockton Field (R-New Jersey)

Public Buildings and Grounds 
 Solomon Foot (R-Vermont) (Chairman)
 James Dixon (R-Connecticut)
 Zachariah Chandler (R-Michigan)
 Jesse D. Bright (D-Indiana)
 Anthony Kennedy (U-Maryland)
 John B. Henderson (D-Missouri)

Territories 
 [[James Mitchell Ashley ]] (R-Ohio) (Chairman)
 Morton S. Wilkinson (R-Minnesota) 
 Edgar Cowan (R-Pennsylvania)
 John P. Hale (R-New Hampshire)
 Stephen A. Douglas (D-Illinois)
 William K. Sebastian (D-Arkansas)
 Thomas Bragg (D-North Carolina)
 John S. Carlile (U-Virginia)
 Orville Hickman Browning (R-Illinois)
 Andrew Johnson (D-Tennessee)
 Samuel C. Pomeroy (R-Kansas)

Audit and Control the Contingent Expenses of the Senate 
 James Dixon (R-Connecticut) (Chairman)
 Daniel Clark (R-New Hampshire)
 Andrew Johnson (D-Tennessee)
 Benjamin F. Harding (D-Oregon)

Printing 
 Henry B. Anthony (R-Rhode Island) (Chairman)
 James Harlan (R-Iowa)
 Lazarus W. Powell (D-Kentucky)

Engrossed Bills 
 James H. Lane (R-Kansas) (Chairman)
 Lot Morrill (R-Maryland)
 Samuel G. Arnold (R-Rhode Island)
 Charles B. Mitchel (D-Arkansas)

Enrolled Bills 
 Kinsley S. Bingham (R-Michigan) (Chairman)
 Edward D. Baker (R-Oregon)
 Waitman T. Willey (U-Virginia)
 Willard Saulsbury Sr. (D-Delaware)

The Library 
 James Pearce (D-Maryland) (Chairman)
 Jacob Collamer (R-Vermont)
 William P. Fessenden (R-Maine)

Order in the Galleries (Select) 
 Henry B. Anthony (R-Rhode Island)
 James Murray Mason (D-Virginia)
 Benjamin F. Wade (R-Ohio)

House of Representatives 

Members by committee assignments, Congressional Globe, as published July 8, 1861 Spellings conform to those found in the Congressional Biographical Dictionary.

Unless otherwise noted, all committees listed are Standing, as found at the Library of Congress

Accounts 
 James Buffinton (R-Massachusetts) (Chairman)
 Edward H. Rollins (R-New Hampshire)
 William E. Lehman (D-Pennsylvania)
 Samuel T. Worcester (R-Ohio)
 George W. Dunlap (U-Kentucky)

Agriculture 
 Owen Lovejoy (R-Illinois)
 Dwight Loomis (R-Connecticut)
 Charles B. Calvert (U-Maryland)
 Edward H. Smith (R-New York)
 Jacob P. Chamberlain (R-New York)
 John P.C. Shanks (R-Indiana)
 Joseph Bailey (D-Pennsylvania)
 Samuel T. Worcester (R-Ohio)
 Cyrus Aldrich (R-Minnesota)

Claims 
 Reuben E. Fenton (R-New York)
 Eliakim Persons Walton (R-Vermont)
 William S. Holman (D-Indiana)
 John Hutchins (R-Ohio)
 James T. Hale (R-Pennsylvania)
 John W. Noell (D-Missouri)
 R. Holland Duell (R-New York)
 Edwin H. Webster (U-Maryland)
 John W. Wallace (R-Pennsylvania)

Commerce 
 Elihu B. Washburne (R-Illinois) (Chairman)
 Thomas D. Eliot (R-Massachusetts)
 Elijah Ward (D-New York)
 John T. Nixon (R-New Jersey)
 Elijah Babbitt (R-Pennsylvania)
 John A. Gurley (R-Ohio)
 James S. Rollins (CU-Missouri)
 Cornelius L. L. Leary (U-Maryland)
 William P. Sheffield (R-Rhode Island)

Confiscation of Rebel Property (Select) 
Listed in Library of Congress summary, but not in Congressional Globe of July 22, 1861

District of Columbia 
 James M. Ashley (R-Ohio)
 Charles B. Calvert (U-Maryland)
 Richard Franchot (R-Ohio)
 Edward H. Rollins (R-New Hampshire)
 William Morris Davis (R-Pennsylvania)
 Charles H. Upton (U-Virginia)

Elections 
 Henry L. Dawes (R-Massachusetts) (Chairman)
 James H. Campbell (R-Pennsylvania)
 Daniel W. Voorhees (D-Indiana)
 James B. McKean (R-New York)
 Dwight Loomis (R-Connecticut)
 Portus Baxter (R-Vermont)
 George H. Browne (D-Rhode Island)
 John W. Menzies (D-Vermont)

Emancipation 
Listed in Library of Congress summary, but not in Congressional Globe of July 22, 1861

Expenditures in the State Department 
 James B. McKean (R-New York) (Chairman)
 James C. Robinson (D-Illinois)
 John T. Nixon (R-New Jersey)
 William Vandever (R-Iowa)
 Charles H. Upton (U-Virginia)

Expenditures in the Treasury Department 
 Moses F. Odell (D-New York) (Chairman)
 James H. Campbell (R-Pennsylvania)
 John A. Bingham (R-Ohio)
 Alexander H. Rice (R-Massachusetts)
 William G. Steele (D-New Jersey)

Expenditures in the War Department 
 William A. Wheeler (R-New York)
 Samuel R. Curtis (R-Iowa)
 Chauncey Vibbard (D-New York)
 William Mitchell (R-Indiana)
 James S. Rollins (CU-Maryland)

Expenditures in the Post Office Department 
 John W. Killinger (R-Pennsylvania) (Chairman)
 Charles A. Wickliffe (U-Kentucky)
 Carey A. Trimble (R-Ohio)
 Francis W. Kellogg (R-Michigan)
 Edward H. Smith (D-New York)

Expenditures in the Interior Department 
 William Allen (D-Ohio) (Chairman)
 Martin F. Conway (R-Kansas)
 Socrates N. Sherman (R-New York)
 Samuel Shellabarger (R-Ohio)
 Thomas B. Cooper (D-Pennsylvania)

Finance 
Listed in Library of Congress summary, but not in Congressional Globe of July 22, 1861

Foreign Affairs 
Also known as Foreign Relations

 John J. Crittenden (U-Kentucky)
 Daniel W. Gooch (R-Massachusetts)
 Samuel S. Cox (D-Ohio)
 Albert S. White (R-Indiana)
 Robert McKnight (R-Pennsylvania)
 Alfred A. Burnham (R-Pennsylvania)
 Francis Thomas (R-Maryland)
 Theodore M. Pomeroy (R-New York)
 George P. Fisher (R-Delaware)

Indian Affairs 
 Cyrus Aldrich (R-Minnesota) (Chairman)
 Thomas M. Edwards (R-New Hampshire)
 Robert Mallory (U-Kentucky)
 Martin F. Conway (R-Kansas)
 William Mitchell (R-Indiana)
 Moses F. Odell (D-New York)
 William E. Lansing (R-New York)
 John Patton (R-Pennsylvania)
 Andrew J. Thayer (D-Oregon)

Invalid Pensions 
 Alfred Ely (R-New York) (Chairman)
 Socrates N. Sherman (R-New York)
 John A. Logan (R-Illinois)
 Richard A. Harrison (U-Ohio)
 William P. Cutler (R-Ohio)
 Kellian V. Whaley (U-Virginia)
 John N. Goodwin (D-Maine)
 Benjamin Wood (D-New York)
 George T. Cobb (D-New Jersey)

Judiciary 
 Albert G. Porter (R-Indiana)
 John S. Carlile (U-Virginia)
 Benjamin F. Thomas (U-Massachusetts)
 Henry May (U-Maryland)
 Alexander S. Diven (R-New York)

Lake and River Defences 
Listed in Library of Congress summary, but not in Congressional Globe of July 22, 1861

Manufactures 
Listed in the Congressional Globe, but not listed in the Library of Congress summary page
 John Hutchins (R-Ohio) (Chairman)
 James K. Moorhead (R-Pennsylvania)
 Edward Haight (R-New York)
 John B. Alley (R-Massachusetts)
 Albert G. Porter (R-Indiana)
 Alfred Ely (R-New York)
 Isaac N. Arnold (R-Illinois)
 Sydenham E. Ancona (D-Pennsylvania)
 William G. Brown (D-Virginia)

Mileage 
Listed in the Congressional Globe, but not listed in the Library of Congress summary page
 James C. Robinson (D-Illinois) (Chairman)
 John W. Killinger (R-Pennsylvania)
 Augustus Frank (R-New York)
 Henry Grider (R-Kentucky)
 Benjamin Wood (D-New York)

Military Affairs 
Also known as Military
 Francis P. Blair Jr. (R-Missouri) (Chairman)
 William A. Richardson (D-Illinois)
 James Buffinton (R-Massachusetts)
 Abram B. Olin (R-New York)
 William Allen (D-Ohio)
 Gilman Marston (R-New Hampshire)
 Hendrick B. Wright (R-Massachusetts)
 James S. Jackson (U-Kentucky)

Military Railroad 
Listed in Library of Congress summary, but not in Congressional Globe of July 22, 1861

Militia 
Also known as Military Affairs and the Militia
 Robert B. Van Valkenburg (R-New York) (Chairman)
 William M. Dunn (R-Indiana)
 Sydenham E. Ancona (D-Indiana)
 Charles Delano (D-Republican)
 Charles J. Biddle (D-Pennsylvania)
 Richard A. Harrison (U-Ohio)
 William G. Brown (D-Virginia)
 William P. Cutler (R-Ohio)
 John N. Goodwin (R-Maine)

Naval Affairs 
 Charles B. Sedgwick (R-New York) (Chairman)
 Alexander H. Rice (R-Massachusetts)
 Philip B. Fouke (R-Illinois)
 James K. Moorhead (R-Massachusetts)
 James E. English (R-Connecticut)
 John P. Verree (R-Pennsylvania)
 Frederick A. Pike (R-Maine)
 Frederick A. Conkling (R-New York)
 William H. Wadsworth (R-Kentucky)

Niagara Ship Canal (Select) 
Listed in Library of Congress summary, but not in Congressional Globe of July 22, 1861
 Burt Van Horn, Chairman (R-New York)

Pacific Railroad 
Listed in Library of Congress summary, but not in Congressional Globe of July 22, 1861

Patents 
Also known as Patents and Patent Office
 William M. Dunn (R-New York) (Chairman)
 John H. Rice (R-Maine)
 Stephen Baker (R-New York)
 Philip Johnson (R-Pennsylvania)
 Warren P. Noble (D-Ohio)

Pensions 
Listed in Library of Congress summary, but not in Congressional Globe of July 22, 1861

Post Offices and Post Roads 
 Schuler Colfax (R-Indiana) (Chairman)
 John B. Alley (R-Massachusetts)
 Charles A. Wickliffe (U-Kentucky)
 Anson P. Morrill (R-Maine)
 William Windom (R-Minnesota)
 Harrison G. Blake (R-Ohio)
 Chauncey Vibbard (D-New York)
 Rowland E. Trowbridge (R-Michigan)
 Elijah H. Norton (R-Missouri)

Printing 
Also known as Joint Committee on Printing

 Eliakim Persons Walton (R-Vermont)
 Ambrose W. Clark (R-New York)
 Joseph Bailey (D-Pennsylvania)

Private Land Claims 
 John W. Noell (D-Missouri)
 Luther Hanchett (R-Wisconsin)
 Burt Van Horn (R-New York)
 John P. C. Shanks (R-Indiana)
 Charles W. Walton (R-Maine)
 Samuel Shellabarger (R-Ohio)
 Jesse Lazear (D-Pennsylvania)

Public Lands 
 John F. Potter (R-Wisconsin) (Chairman)
 John Covode (R-Pennsylvania)
 Clement L. Vallandingham (D-Ohio)
 George W. Julian (R-Indiana)
 Carey A. Trimble (R-Ohio)
 William Vandever (R-Iowa)
 Francis W. Kellogg (R-Alabama)
 John W. Crisfield (R-Maryland)
 George C. Woodruff (D-Connecticut)

Public Buildings and Grounds 
 Charles R. Train (R-Massachusetts) (Chairman)
 Owen Lovejoy (R-Illinois)
 Isaac C. Delaplaine (D-New York)
 Robert McKnight (R-Pennsylvania)
 James R. Morris (D-Ohio)

Public Expenditures 
 John Covode (R-Pennsylvania) (Chairman)
 Thomas M. Edwards (R-New Hampshire)
 James E. Kerrigan (D-New York)
 Charles R. Train (R-Massachusetts)
 William Windom (R-Minnesota)
 Edwin H. Webster (U-Maryland)
 George W. Julian (R-Indiana) 
 Luther Hanchett (R-Wisconsin)
 Chilton A. White (D-Ohio)

Revised and Unfinished Business 
Listed in the Congressional Globe, but not listed in the Library of Congress summary page
 John A. Logan (D-Illinois)
 Elijah Babbitt (R-Pennsylvania)
 John W. Menzies (U-Kentucky)
 Samuel C. Fessenden (R-Maine)
 Edward Haight (D-New York)

Revolutionary Claims 
 R. Holland Duell (R-New York) (Chairman)
 Sidney Edgerton (R-Ohio)
 Thomas B. Cooper (D-Pennsylvania)
 John H. Rice (R-Maine)
 William Wall (R-New York)
 Nehemiah Perry (D-New Jersey)
 Henry Grider (R-Kentucky)
 Albert G. Riddle (R-Ohio)
 Anson P. Morrill (R-Maine)

Revolutionary Pensions 
 Charles H. Van Wyck (R-New York) (Chairman)
 Samuel S. Blair (R-Pennsylvania)
 John S. Carlile (U-Virginia)
 John F. Potter (R-Wisconsin)
 William M. Davis (R-Pennsylvania)
 John B. Steele (D-New York)
 Bradley F. Granger (R-Michigan)
 John Law (D-Indiana)
 William G. Steele (D-New Jersey)

Roads and Canals 
 Robert Mallory (U-Kentucky) (Chairman)
 John A. Gurley (R-Ohio)
 James T. Hale (R-Pennsylvania)
 Burt Van Horn (R-New York)
 Isaac N. Arnold (R-Illinois)
 Robert H. Nugen (D-Ohio)
 Stephen Baker (R-New York)
 Philip Johnson (D-Pennsylvania)
 Fernando C. Beaman (R-Michigan)

State of the Union 
Listed in Library of Congress summary, but not in Congressional Globe of July 22, 1861

Territories 
 James M. Ashley (R-Ohio) (Chairman)
 Charles H. Van Wyck (R-New York)
 James A. Cravens (D-Indiana)
 William Kellogg (R-Illinois)
 Fernando C. Beaman (R-Michigan)
 John W. Reid (D-Missouri)
 A. Scott Sloan (R-Wisconsin)
 Goldsmith F. Bailey (R-Massachusetts)
 Aaron Harding (D-Kentucky)

Ways and Means 
 Thaddeus Stevens (R-Pennsylvania) (Chairman)
 Justin S. Morrill (R-Vermont)
 John S. Phelps (D-Missouri)
 Elbridge G. Spaulding (R-New York)
 William Appleton (R-Massachusetts)
 Erastus Corning (D-New York)
 Valentine B. Horton (R-Ohio)
 John A. McClernand (D-Illinois)
 John L. N. Stratton (R-New Jersey)

Joint committees

Enrolled Bills 
 Rep. Bradley F. Granger (R-Michigan)
 Rep. George T. Cobb (D-New Jersey)

The Library 
 Rep. Edward McPherson (R-Pennsylvania)
 Rep. Augustus Frank (R-New York)
 Rep. John Law (D-Indiana)

Caucuses 
 Democratic (House)
 Democratic (Senate)

Employees

Legislative branch agency directors 
 Architect of the Capitol: Thomas U. Walter
 Librarian of Congress: John Gould Stephenson

Senate 
 Chaplain: Phineas D. Gurley (Presbyterian), until July 10, 1861
 Byron Sunderland (Presbyterian), elected July 10, 1861
 Secretary: Asbury Dickins, until July 10, 1861
 John W. Forney, elected July 15, 1861
 William Hickey (Chief Clerk) appointed "Acting Secretary", March 22, 1861
 Sergeant at Arms: Dunning R. McNair, until July 6, 1861
 George T. Brown, elected July 6, 1861

House of Representatives 
 Chaplain: Thomas H. Stockton (Methodist), elected July 6, 1861
 Clerk: John W. Forney, until July 4, 1861
 Emerson Etheridge, elected July 4, 1861
 Doorkeeper: Ira Goodnow
 Messenger to the Speaker: Thaddeus Morrice
 Postmaster: William S. King
 Reading Clerks: 
 Sergeant at Arms: Henry William Hoffman, until July 5, 1861
 Edward Ball, elected July 5, 1861

See also 
 1860 United States elections (elections leading to this Congress)
 1860 United States presidential election
 1860–61 United States Senate elections
 1860–61 United States House of Representatives elections
 1862 United States elections (elections during this Congress, leading to the next Congress)
 1862–63 United States Senate elections
 1862–63 United States House of Representatives elections

Notes

References

Sources 
 
 
  Alt URL

External links 
 Statutes at Large, 1789-1875
 Senate Journal, First Forty-three Sessions of Congress
 House Journal, First Forty-three Sessions of Congress